Meadow brome may refer to:

Bromus biebersteinii
Bromus commutatus
Bromus erectus
Bromus riparius